Henry Lee Giclas (December 9, 1910 – April 2, 2007) was an American astronomer and a discoverer of minor planets and comets.

He worked at Lowell Observatory using the blink comparator, and hired Robert Burnham Jr. to work there. He also worked on a notable proper motion survey with several relatively nearby stars bearing his name such as Giclas 99-49.

Henry Giclas is credited by the Minor Planet Center with the discovery of 17 numbered minor planets between 1943 and 1978, including 2201 Oljato – tentatively identified as the parent body of the "Chi Orionids" meteor shower – and 2061 Anza, two near-Earth asteroids of the Apollo and Amor group, respectively.

He also discovered 84P/Giclas in 1978, a periodic comet of the Jupiter family.

Henry Giclas died of a stroke at the age of 96 in Flagstaff, Arizona. The crater Giclas on Pluto, as well as the asteroid 1741 Giclas, discovered by the Indiana Asteroid Program in 1960, are named for him.

References

External links 
 Biography

1910 births
2007 deaths
American astronomers
Discoverers of asteroids
Discoverers of comets
 
People from Flagstaff, Arizona